The Forney Energy Center is a natural gas-fired power station located in Forney, Texas. The energy center was commissioned in 2003 and features six 304 MW combined-cycle generators. It is the second largest natural gas-fired power station in Texas after the Sabine Power Plant.

See also
List of power stations in Texas
List of largest power stations in the United States

References

2003 establishments in Texas
Energy infrastructure completed in 2003
Natural gas-fired power stations in Texas
Vistra Corp